Garcin may refer to:

 People with the surname
 Éric Garcin (born 1965), French football player and coach
 Estève Garcin (1784–1859), Occitan language writer
 Federico Garcín (born 1973), Uruguayan basketball player
 Gilles Garcin (1647–1702), French painter
 Ginette Garcin (1928–2010), French actress
 Henri Garcin (born 1929), Belgian actor
 Jérôme Garcin (born 1956), French journalist and writer
 Joseph Héliodore Garcin de Tassy (1794–1878), French orientalist
 Jules Garcin (1830–1896), French violinist, conductor and composer

 Places
 Garčin, Brod-Posavina County, Croatia
 Gârcin River, Romania